The Mental Health Parity Act (MHPA) is legislation signed into United States law on September 26, 1996 that requires annual or lifetime dollar limits on mental health benefits to be no lower than any such dollar limits for medical and surgical benefits offered by a group health plan or health insurance issuer offering coverage in connection with a group health plan. Prior to MHPA and similar legislation, insurers were not required to cover mental health care and so access to treatment was limited, underscoring the importance of the act.

The MHPA was largely superseded by the Paul Wellstone and Pete Domenici Mental Health Parity and Addiction Equity Act (MHPAEA), which the 110th United States Congress passed as rider legislation on the Troubled Asset Relief Program (TARP) in Public Law 110-343, signed into law by President George W. Bush in October 2008. Notably, the 2010 Patient Protection and Affordable Care Act extended the reach of MHPAEA provisions to many health insurance plans outside its previous scope.

Scope
The MHPA applies to group health plans for plan years beginning on or after January 1, 1998.  The original sunset provision provided that the parity requirements would not apply to benefits for services furnished on or after September 30, 2001. It was extended six times, with the final extension running through December 31, 2007.  Insurers promptly were able to "circumvent" the consumer protections arguably intended in the legislation by imposing maximum numbers of provider visits and/or caps on the number of days an insurer would cover for inpatient psychiatric hospitalizations.  In essence, the law had little or no effect on mental health coverage by group insurance plans.  The rider on TARP prohibits all group health plans that offer mental health coverage from imposing any greater limit on co-pays, co-insurance, numbers of visits, and/or number of days covered for hospital stays due to mental health conditions.  The rider legislation was the culmination of a long campaign fought by Sen. Paul Wellstone (D-MN) and his successors to enact mental health parity at the federal level.  The new law's requirements will be phased in over several years.  Still unsure is whether non-"biologically-based" mental illnesses such as PTSD and eating disorders are mandated to be covered by the new law.

Requirements
Generally the act required parity of mental health benefits with medical and surgical benefits with respect to the application of aggregate lifetime and annual dollar limits under a group health plan. It provided that employers retain discretion regarding the extent and scope of mental health benefits offered to workers and their families, including cost sharing, limits on numbers of visits or days of coverage, and requirements relating to medical necessity.

The law also contained three exemptions:
 No mental health coverage
 Business that chose not to provide mental health coverage.
 Small employers
 Businesses with fewer than 50 employees.
 Increased cost
 Businesses that documented at least one percent increase in premiums due to implementation of parity requirements.

Issues with the MHPA
Immediately after MHPA was enacted, insurers and employers began finding ways to circumvent the legislation. Larger emphasis on cost sharing, primarily implemented through higher copayments, deductibles, and out-of-pocket maximums, was one strategy used by insurers. In addition, limits and caps on the number of visits with a care provider or number of days in a hospital visit were imposed. MHPA also did not provide benefits for substance abuse and dependency issues. Lastly, MHPA contained a sunset provision that meant that the law would go out of effect after a certain date. The original sunset date was extended six times, through 2007.

Mental Health Parity and Addiction Equity Act

The Paul Wellstone and Pete Domenici Mental Health Parity and Addiction Equity Act (MHPAEA) was enacted in October 2008 and took effect on 1 January 2009. The main purpose of MHPAEA was to fill the loopholes left by the MHPA. The act requires health insurers as well as group health plans to guarantee that financial requirements on benefits, including co-pays, deductibles, and out-of-pocket maximums, and limitations on treatment benefits such as caps on visits with a provider or days in a hospital visit, for mental health or substance use disorders are not more restrictive than the insurer's requirements and restrictions for medical and surgical benefits. MHPAEA only applies to insurance plans for public and private sector employers with over 50 employees and health insurance issuers who sell coverage to employers with more than 50 employees.
Similar to MHPA, MHPAEA requires parity in terms of total annual dollar limits, as well as aggregate lifetime benefits. It is important to note however, that MHPAEA does not explicitly require that any insurance plan offer benefits for mental health and substance abuse disorders. Instead, it enacts parity rules for plans that choose to offer both medical and surgical benefits as well as mental health and substance abuse disorder benefits. This includes out-of-network benefits. If plans choose to offer both types of benefits, MHPAEA mandates that insurers define and make available specific criteria for medical necessity when it comes to mental health and substance abuse disorder benefits. In addition, MHPAEA also requires that insurers provide specific information and reasons in the event that reimbursement or payment for treatment is denied.

Implementation challenges
One main challenge to the implementation of MHPAEA is what is known as "carve-out" health benefits. This refers to mental health benefits that are purchased by employers separately from medical benefits. The "carve-out" vendor may be separate from any number of other vendors providing medical benefits. The law would require the "carve-out" vendor to ensure parity with medical benefits provided by a separate vendor or vendors. In addition, the legislation itself did not create a mechanism to regularly monitor or evaluate the enforcement or implementation of the act.

The Federal Parity Law and the follow-up regulatory/sub-regulatory guidance is complex and sometimes ambiguous.  Solutions are needed to help implement and enforce the Federal Parity Law and applicable state laws.  This includes opportunities to help automate and document NQTL comparability analyses in writing and in operation to further validate that the plan is treating MH/SUD coverage requirements/payments in the same manner as medical/surgical care. Several tools exist that can help promote parity compliance including the U.S. DOL Self-Compliance Tool, the CMS Parity Compliance Toolkit for Medicaid/CHIP, the Six Step Parity Compliance Guide,  and ClearHealth Quality Institute’s Online Parity Tool.

References

Further reading
 
  
  

United States federal health legislation
Mental health law in the United States
Acts of the 110th United States Congress
Acts of the 104th United States Congress
Healthcare reform legislation in the United States